The Big River is a river in the U.S. state of Rhode Island. It flows . There are no dams along the river's length.

Course
The river is formed in West Greenwich by the confluence of the Congdon and Nooseneck rivers. From there, it flows due north through West Greenwich and Coventry to its confluence with the Flat River, in the area now flooded by the Flat River Reservoir, to form the South Branch Pawtuxet River.

Crossings
Below is a list of all crossings over the Big River. The list starts at the headwaters and goes downstream.
West Greenwich
Nooseneck Hill Road (RI 3)
Interstate 95
Coventry
Harkney Hill Road (RI 118)
Hill Farm Road

Tributaries
The Carr River is the Big River's only named tributary, though it has many unnamed streams that also feed it.

See also
List of rivers in Rhode Island

References

Maps from the United States Geological Survey

Rivers of Kent County, Rhode Island
West Greenwich, Rhode Island
Coventry, Rhode Island
Rivers of Rhode Island
Tributaries of Providence River